Frignani is an Italian surname. Notable people with the surname include:

 Amleto Frignani (1932–1997), Italian footballer
 Daniele Frignani (born 1977), Italian baseball player
 Giovanni Frignani (1897–1944), Italian soldier and Resistance member

Italian-language surnames